Postal Babes (stylized as POSTALBabes) is a mobile game developed for Running with Scissors by HeroCraft.

Though part of the Postal series of video games, the plot of Postal Babes has nothing to do with the storyline that follows The Postal Dude. Instead, this mobile game focuses on the eponymous "Postal Babes", a group of attractive fictional women who are skilled in the use of weapons and that have made appearances in other installments of the Postal series.

Plot 
The Postal Babes receive a message alerting them that there are some strange events taking place in the local university. The Postal Babes discover that some maniacs have taken over the university, and that they have taken first year girls as hostages. The Postal Babes must infiltrate the university and go through 12 action-packed levels to rescue the hostages. During their journey, the Postal Babes have many different weapons at their disposal, including but not limited to baseball bats, knives and machine guns.

References

External links 
 

2009 video games
Action video games
Android (operating system) games
HeroCraft games
J2ME games
Mobile games
Postal (franchise)
Single-player video games
Video games developed in Russia
Video games featuring female protagonists